Asano Yoshinaga (August 14, 1681 – February 27, 1752) was a Japanese daimyō of the Edo period, who ruled the Hiroshima Domain.

Family
 Father: Asano Tsunanaga
 Mother: Tokugawa Atehime (1666–1683), daughter of Tokugawa Mitsutomo, 2nd Daimyo of Owari Domain
 Wife: Maeda Ushihime, daughter of Maeda Tsunanori, 4th Daimyo of Kaga Domain
 Children:
 Asano Munetsune by Ushihime
 Chohime married Sakai Tadayori of Tsuruoka Domain by Ushihime
 daughter married Matsudaira Masamoto later married Soma Noritane of Sōma Domain
 daughter married Matsudaira Sadateru of Takada Domain later married Abe Masanao

References

1681 births
1752 deaths
Daimyo
Asano clan